Tang Chiu Mang (born 24 July 1990) is a Hong Kong competitive rower.

He qualified to the 2016 Summer Olympics in Rio de Janeiro, and was selected to represent Hong Kong in the men's lightweight double sculls, together with Chiu Hin Chun. He placed 19th in the Rowing Lightweight Men's Double Sculls event.

References

1990 births
Living people
Hong Kong male rowers
Olympic rowers of Hong Kong
Rowers at the 2016 Summer Olympics
Asian Games medalists in rowing
Rowers at the 2010 Asian Games
Rowers at the 2014 Asian Games
Rowers at the 2018 Asian Games
Asian Games silver medalists for Hong Kong
Asian Games bronze medalists for Hong Kong
Medalists at the 2010 Asian Games
Medalists at the 2014 Asian Games
Medalists at the 2018 Asian Games
21st-century Hong Kong people